Peter van de Ven (born 8 January 1961) is a Dutch former professional footballer who played as a midfielder.

Career
Born in Hunsel, Van de Ven spent the first half of his career in his home province of Limburg playing with Fortuna Sittard and Roda JC. After periods with Charleroi and Willem II, he moved to Scotland in 1990 to play with Aberdeen, making 55 league appearances in two seasons. Van de Ven also played for Hearts, making 39 league appearances. In the final year of his career, Van de Ven played in Belgium for Racing Genk.

References

1961 births
Living people
Dutch footballers
Fortuna Sittard players
Roda JC Kerkrade players
R. Charleroi S.C. players
Willem II (football club) players
Aberdeen F.C. players
Heart of Midlothian F.C. players
K.R.C. Genk players
Eredivisie players
Belgian Pro League players
Scottish Football League players
Dutch expatriate footballers
Expatriate footballers in Scotland
Expatriate footballers in Belgium
People from Leudal
Association football midfielders
Dutch expatriate sportspeople in Scotland
Dutch expatriate sportspeople in Belgium
Footballers from Limburg (Netherlands)